Step Up to the Microphone is the seventh studio album by Christian pop rock band Newsboys, released in 1998 through Star Song Communications. It was the Newsboys' first album following the departure of lead singer John James in 1997, with Peter Furler and Phil Joel subsequently sharing lead vocal duties.

Track listing

Music videos
"Entertaining Angels"

Radio singles
<small>Note: all ''CCM Magazine chart information is available in the book Hot Hits CHR 1978-1997 (1997) by Jeffrey Lee Brothers</small>

 Personnel Newsboys Peter Furler – lead vocals, drums, guitars, programming
 Phil Joel – vocals, bass guitar, guitars
 Jody Davis – lead and rhythm guitars, bass, vocals
 Jeff Frankenstein – keys, vocals, programming
 Duncan Phillips – percussion, drums, vocalsAdditional musicians Mylon LeFevre – Na-Nas on "WooHoo"
 "Bull" – Na-Nas on "WooHoo"
 Summer Furler – Na-Nas on "WooHoo"
 The Love Sponge Strings – strings on "Entertaining Angels"
 Blair Masters – strings on "Believe" 
 Jonathan Roberts – trumpet on "Tuning In"Production'''

 Peter Furler – producer, mixing
 Wes Campbell – executive producer, mixing
 Danny Goodwin – executive producer
 John Mays – executive producer
 Richie Biggs – recording, mixing 
 Jeff Frankenstein – additional mixing
 Glenn Meadows – mastering at Georgetown Masters, Nashville, Tennessee
 Christiév Carothers – creative direction
 Len Peltier – art direction
 Thom Bissett – graphic design for a3dtb/D
 John Dunne – photography

References

Newsboys albums
1998 albums